Samsung Life Insurance (Korean: 삼성생명보험) is a South Korean multinational insurance company headquartered in Seoul, South Korea, and a subsidiary of the Samsung Group. It is the largest insurance company in South Korea and a Fortune Global 500 company.

Samsung Life's principal products include life, health insurance and annuities. Samsung Life was a private company from its foundation in 1957 until it went public in May 2010. The IPO was the largest in South Korean history and made Samsung Life one of the country's most valuable companies measured by market capitalization. Its headquarters are situated across from Namdaemun, a historic gate located in the heart of Seoul.

History
Founded in 1957, the company quickly grew and attained a market leading position after just 18 months of operations. Since then, Samsung Life Insurance has maintained its market leadership in the industry through product innovation, marketing, and distribution. In particular, the growth was accelerated after the company was incorporated under Samsung Group in 1963.

In 1986, the company opened representative offices in New York and Tokyo. It has also expanded in overseas operation through a joint venture in Thailand in 1997 and China in 2005. The company was the first life insurance company in Korea to achieve KRW 100 Trillion Won in assets in 2006. On May 12, 2010, Samsung Life Insurance went public and the shares went for 110,000 won, or $96/share in one of the largest initial offerings and a record for the country, raising $4.4 billion.

See also 
 Korea Life Insurance Association
 List of Korean companies
 Yongin Samsung Life Blueminx

References

External links 
 Samsung Global
 Samsung Fire & Marine

Insurance companies of South Korea
Multinational companies headquartered in South Korea
Life Insurance
Companies based in Seoul
Financial services companies established in 1957
Companies listed on the Korea Exchange
South Korean brands
South Korean companies established in 1957
Life insurance companies